Explosives safety originated as a formal program in the United States in the aftermath of World War I when several ammunition storage areas were destroyed in a series of mishaps. The most serious occurred at Picatinny Arsenal Ammunition Storage Depot, New Jersey, in July, 1926 when an electrical storm led to fires that caused explosions and widespread destruction. The severe property damage and 19 fatalities led Congress to empower a board of Army and Naval officers to investigate the Picatinny Arsenal disaster and determine if similar conditions existed at other ammunition depots. The board reported in its findings that this mishap could recur, prompting Congress to establish a permanent board of colonels to develop explosives safety standards and ensure compliance beginning in 1928. This organization evolved into the Department of Defense Explosives Safety Board (DDESB) and is chartered in Title 10 of the US Code. The DDESB authors Defense Explosives Safety Regulation (DESR) 6055.9 which establishes the explosives safety standards for the Department of Defense. The DDESB also evaluates scientific data which may adjust those standards, reviews and approves all explosives site plans for new construction, and conducts worldwide visits to locations containing US title munitions. The cardinal principle of explosives safety is expose the minimum number of people for the minimum time to the minimum amount of explosives.

US Air Force
The United States Air Force counterpart to the DDESB is the Air Force Safety Center (AFSEC/SEW). Similar safety functions are found at major command headquarters, intermediate command headquarters, and installation weapons safety offices, culminating with unit-level explosives safety programs. The current Air Force regulation governing explosives safety is Air Force Manual (AFMAN) 91-201. AFMAN 91-201 was developed using DESR 6055.09 as a parent regulation, and in most cases follows the limitations set forth in the DESR (excluding mission-specific requirements). The Air Force deviates from DESR 6055.9 as long as the risks of doing so are assessed and accepted at the appropriate level.

US Army
The United States Army counterpart to the DDESB is the U.S. Army Technical Center for Explosives Safety (USATCES). The USATCES is located with the Defense Ammunition Center on McAlester Army Ammunition Plant, near McAlester, Oklahoma . USATCES is responsible for providing ammunition and explosives (A&E) safety worldwide by acting as the field office of the Department of Army Safety responsible for A&E safety. The USATCES also acts as the Army agency having safety oversight of clean-up of Former Used Defense Sites (FUDS) and Former Toxic Chemical Agent Sites where munitions from all branches of service disposed of A&E by burial or dumping up until the end of the Vietnam War. The USATCES acts as the Army's safety watchdog for disposal of chemical ammunition at the Army's Chemical Disposal Facilities. As part of Army's Ordnance Corps under TRADOC Specially trained Civilian Explosives Safety Personnel [Quality Assurance Specialist (Ammunition Surveillance) (QASAS)]  and Safety Specialist that have received specialized training in A&E Safety) from the USATCES are deployed worldwide, wherever the U.S. Army has A&E. Their mission is to provide A&E safety to the soldier, the public, and the environment making sure the Army's A&E is not only stored safely but ready, reliable, and lethal when the U.S. military needs it.

Net Explosives Weight (NEW)
The net explosives weight (NEW) is the total weight of all explosives substances in a single item. NEW is used to calculate safe separation distances (see Quantity-Distance). NEW for a specific explosive may be adjusted by its TNT equivalence which is the weight of trinitrotoluene (TNT) required to produce a shockwave of equal magnitude as that produced by one pound of the explosive in question. For example, C-4 has a TNT equivalency for overpressure of 1.34 (one pound of C-4 is equal to 1.34 pounds of TNT).

Quantity-Distance (QD)
Quantity-Distance (QD) is the foundation of DOD explosives safety standards. It defines levels of protection from blast based on relationships between the quantity of explosive material (NEW) and distance. The relationships are based on levels of risk considered acceptable for specific exposures but they do not provide absolute safety or protection. Exposures are expressed by a “K-factor” (K6, K18, etc.) which represents the degree of protection provided; higher is better.

Blast Wave Phenomena
A Blast Wave Phenomenon is an incident involving the violent release of energy created by detonation of an explosive device. The sudden and intense pressure disturbance is termed the “blast wave.” The blast wave is characterized by an almost instantaneous rise from ambient pressure to a peak incident pressure (Pi). This pressure increase or “shock front,” travels radially outward from the detonation point, with a diminishing velocity that is always in excess of the speed of sound in that medium. Gas molecules making up the front move at lower velocities. This velocity, which is called the “particle velocity,” is associated with the “dynamic pressure,” or the pressure formed by the winds produced by the shock front. As the shock front expands into increasingly larger volumes of the medium, the incident pressure decreases and, generally, the duration of the pressure-pulse increase. If the shock wave strikes a rigid surface (e.g., a building) at an angle to the direction of the wave's propagation, a reflected pressure is instantly developed on the surface and this pressure rises to a value that exceeds the incident pressure. This reflected pressure is a function of the incident wave's pressure and the angle formed between the rigid surface and the plane of the shock front.

Fragments
An important consideration in the analysis of the hazards associated with an explosion is the effect of any fragments produced. Although fragmentation most commonly occurs in high explosives events, fragmentation may occur in any incident involving ammunition and explosives (A&E). Depending on their origin, fragments are referred to as “primary” or “secondary” fragments.

Primary fragments result from the shattering of a container (e.g., shell casings, kettles, hoppers, and other containers used in the manufacture of explosives and rocket engine housings) in direct contact with the explosive. These fragments usually are small, initially travel at thousands of feet per second, and may be lethal at long distances from an explosion.

Secondary fragments are debris from structures and other items in close proximity to the explosion. These fragments, which are somewhat larger in size than primary fragments and initially travel at hundreds of feet per second, do not normally travel as far as primary fragments.

Thermal Hazards
Generally, thermal hazards from explosives events are of less concern than blast and fragment hazards. With the release of energy from an explosion is heat. The amount of heat varies with the energetic compound (explosive). All explosives compound molecules are potentially unstable held together with weak bonds in their outer shell. When this weak bond is broken heat and energy is violently released. It normally takes longer for the thermal blast to incur. Injury from thermal effects follows the blast and fragmentation effects which happen almost instantaneously.  This does not imply that there is a time lapse between blast and fragmentation effects of explosives; in fact it happens so fast that humans cannot notice the delay without specialized equipment.  The time available to react to a thermal event does increases survivability by rapid equipment designed to react in a fragment of a second. The primary effect of the thermal effect from an explosive detonation on structures, material, and ammunition and explosives (A&E) is their partial or total destruction by fire. The primary concern for explosives safety with a fire involving A&E is that it may transition to a more severe reaction, causing detonations of additional or more hazardous explosives devises and placing more people or property at a greater degree of risk of damage, destruction, injury, or death.

Susan Test

Following the 1966 Palomares B-52 crash and the 1968 Thule Air Base B-52 crash, accident investigators concluded that the conventional explosives used at the time in nuclear weapons were not stable enough to withstand the forces involved in an aircraft accident.  The finding triggered research by scientists in the United States into safer conventional explosives that could be used in nuclear weapons.  The Lawrence Livermore National Laboratory developed the "Susan Test" — a standard test that uses a special projectile whose design simulates an aircraft accident by squeezing and nipping explosive material between metal surfaces.  The test projectile is fired under controlled conditions at a hard surface to measure the reactions and thresholds of different explosives to an impact.

Explosives Safety Specialist
This is a highly trained and skilled civilian professional usually a QASAS or a Safety Specialist that has been trained to evaluate risk and hazards involved with conventional, guided missiles and toxic chemical ammunition operations. Department of Defense Standards requires that only trained and certified personnel are permitted to participate in operations involving ammunition, explosives, and/or explosive components, guided missiles, and toxic chemicals. They are responsible for providing protection from the effects of ammunition and explosives by evaluation of a set of standards developed by the Department of Defense and reinforced by additional regulations by the branch of military service responsible for the explosives item. 
They develop safety programs to minimize losses due to injuries and property damage. They try to eliminate unsafe practices and conditions on sites where ammunition and explosives (A&E) are used or stored. Military explosives safety specialist are deployed along with U.S. Military forces to maintain safe storage and use of A&E.   They are responsible to recommend to military command ways to store A&E that reduce the risk of injury or death to service men and women in case of an accidental detonation or if the A&E supply is hit by enemy attack.  
 
Much of the work of military explosives safety specialist is identical to their civilian counterparts. They have offices where they analyze data and write reports to upper commands on the storage of A&E.  Much of their time is spent reviewing or preparing explosives safety site plans. An explosives site plan (ESS) is the composite risk management (CRM) process associated with explosives/toxic chemical activities to ensure the minimum risk to personnel, equipment, and assets, while meeting mission requirements. The damage or injury potential of explosions is determined by the separation distance between potential explosion sites (PES) and exposed sites (ES); the ability of the PES to suppress blast overpressure, primary and secondary fragments; and the ability of the ES to resist explosion effects. Planning for the proper location and construction of A&E facilities and surrounding facilities exposed to A&E facilities is a key element of the explosives/toxic chemical site planning process. This management process also ensures that risks above those normally accepted for A&E activities are identified and approved at the proper level of command.

Explosives Safety Specialist must often travel to different storage sites to verify that the military installation is meeting the service explosives safety regulations.

Explosives Safety Specialist often works with other safety professionals. They are required to know OSHA, EPA, NFPA and other consensus standards when looking at safety and if these regulations are stricter than their service regulation they must apply these standards and regulations. They must also know Alcohol, Tobacco, and Firearms (ATF) regulations dealing with A&E and apply those standards if it is required.  They must be able to convince people the need for following prescribes explosives safety standards/regulations. They must also work with ammunition cleanup sites insuring that safety laws and regulations as well as industry standards are followed. They should be good at solving problems.

The military is not the only industry to use explosives safety specialist but are by far the largest employer.  Mining and construction also use explosives safety specialist to evaluate hazard and risk from explosives and blasting operations. Ammunition and explosives manufactures also use these professionals. Outside the military explosives safety specialist must apply and be knowledgeable of ATF, OSHA, EPA, NFPA, as well as state and local regulations dealing with safety of A&E.

See also
Explosion protection
Explosion vent
Explosive material
Explosives shipping classification system

References

External links
 Explosives Safety Support
 ddesb.pentagon
 retrieved 2011-11-23 nasa.gov

Explosives
Explosion protection
Safety